South Central (also known as Mount Carmel) is an unincorporated community in southwestern Washington County, Tennessee.

It is located on Tennessee State Routes 107 and 353 southeast of the city of Tusculum and south of the town of Jonesborough.

Recreation
The community has a small park with a ball field, playground and pavilion called South Central Ruritan Park.

Postal service
South Central does not have a post office or its own zip code. It shares a zip code with Chuckey, Tennessee (37641).

Education
South Central/Mount Carmel is home to South Central Elementary School.

References

Unincorporated communities in Washington County, Tennessee
Unincorporated communities in Tennessee